Beat Seitz (born 28 October 1973) is a Swiss bobsledder who competed in the 1990s. At the 1998 Winter Olympics in Nagano, he won a silver medal in the four-man event with teammates Marcel Rohner, Markus Nüssli and Markus Wasser.

References
Bobsleigh four-man Olympic medalists for 1924, 1932-56, and since 1964
DatabaseOlympics.com profile

1973 births
Living people
Swiss male bobsledders
Bobsledders at the 1998 Winter Olympics
Olympic silver medalists for Switzerland
Olympic bobsledders of Switzerland
Olympic medalists in bobsleigh
Medalists at the 1998 Winter Olympics
20th-century Swiss people